Cory in the House is an American television sitcom which aired on the Disney Channel from January 12, 2007, to September 12, 2008, and was a spin-off from the Disney Channel show That's So Raven. The show focuses on Cory Baxter, who moves from San Francisco, California to Washington, D.C. with his father, after Victor Baxter gets a new job as the White House Executive Chef. The series was the first Disney Channel spin-off series, as well as the final Disney Channel series overall, to be both shot and broadcast in standard definition for the entire run of the show. Reruns of the series have aired on Disney Channel and Disney XD, it also aired on the Family Channel in Canada. Raven-Symoné guest-starred in one episode, reprising her role as Raven Baxter. From 2014 to 2015, Disney Channel had begun a weekly block called "Disney Replay" on Wednesday nights, during which episodes of Cory in the House aired alongside That's So Raven and Kim Possible, among other Disney Channel shows.

Episodes

Characters

Main
Cory Baxter (Kyle Massey) is the protagonist of the series. He is the son of Victor and Tanya Baxter. A teenager, Cory is friends with Newt Livingston, has a crush on Meena Paroom. Cory often is irritated with the President's daughter Sophie Martinez, because of her two-facedness, and also with Candy Smiles, as she keeps calling him "C-Bear". He usually looks to his father for advice. Cory occasionally cooks up various "get-rich-quick" schemes, all of which end badly. He plays in the band DC3 founded by Newt, Cory, and Meena as the Drummer. His catchphrases in this series are "Coming Daddy!","You Know How I Do.","Dang!" and "Daddy No!". Cory is similar to his big sister Raven, from That's So Raven), and they both are always getting into some crazy situation, but in the end they find a way out of it. When he was much younger he played the same role in That's So Raven, though there is a notable difference in portrayal, as younger Cory was introduced as a minor annoyance and villain, while on his own show Cory is much more like his older sister. He will do anything in order to get money. He also loves Beyoncé, who he thinks he will "marry" some day. In some episodes, in a humorous climax, Cory's trousers would fall down, revealing his underwear, usually with dollar-signs on them.
Newton "Newt" Livingston III (Jason Dolley) is the son of a senator and the Chief Justice. He is the best friend of Meena Paroom and Cory Baxter. He is a bit clueless and he loves rock and roll. He has some similar characteristics as Raven's friend Chelsea Daniels, (from That's So Raven). He tends to say, "Awesome!" during situations that are not particularly exciting. For example, when the school students were getting flu shots. He has trouble understanding obvious things, yet he has the knowledge to solve confusing things. He plays the guitar (his favorite being a Squier Stratocaster), and is part of DC3. He also knows about Cory's crush on Meena. He wears jeans and chains whenever he is not in any particular costume. Sophie once had a crush on him. He also hates the idea of running for student body president, as he does not think he will make a good leader, and it would totally throw off his care free life style, despite his parents' wanting him to. Even worse is that if he did run for student body president he says he would win even though he would not try thanks to "the Livingston Curse", a curse meaning that a Livingston will win no matter what (though many people would take that as a blessing). Between his parents, his fear of leadership and the Livingston Curse, Newt has been forced (though he enjoys it) to make up excuses for his parents as to why he can not run for student body president, naming the day of the year he makes them up "Excuse Day". His guitar is a Cherry Flaming Red Fender that is tuned for rock 'n roll.
Meena Paroom (Maiara Walsh) is the daughter of the Bahavian ambassador, a fictional country very similar to Bolivia, containing cultural elements of India, Turkmenistan, Uzbekistan, Tajikistan, Kyrgyzstan, and Pakistan. She likes to wear American clothing and to listen to rock music, which her father frowns upon. Jason Stickler, the son of the head of the CIA, is obsessed with her to the point of spying on her constantly. Meena's father is very disapproving of Cory and Newt. In Ain't Miss Bahavian he once banned her from being near them because he believed that they had hypnotized her to disrespect their country. Her father later decided to let them still be friends after Meena came clean about the secrets she had been keeping. It is obvious that Cory has a crush on her, and believes that she will like him back if he does nice things for her; however Meena does not return Cory's feelings. She has two different crushes during the series named Craig Berkowitz and Nanoosh. Meena is similar to Eddie (from That's So Raven). They both have a love for music, and are the only one of their gender in their group of three. According to Maiara Walsh, her Bahavian accent is a mix of Brazilian Portuguese and Arabic.
Sophia "Sophie" Martinez (Madison Pettis) is the daughter of President Richard Martinez. She is a mischievous girl who loves to annoy people, especially Cory. She has two best friends, Haley and Tanisha, who often compete with Sophie at random things, like class president. She is also known as "America's Angel" by all of America (though she is not one to Cory), and when her nickname is mentioned she often responds using her catch phrase: "That's what they call me!"
President Richard Martinez (John D'Aquino) is the President of the United States and Sophie's father. He often gives Cory advice and mentorship through fond and submissive ways. He often speaks his catchphrase by looking in the camera (thus breaking the fourth wall) and saying, "The President of the United States". He also tries to be funny and tells jokes that are often humorless like in the episode "A Rat By Any Other Name" and in the episode "Nappers Delight". He often counts on his assistant Samantha Samuels in some cases like in the episode "Just Desserts" and the episode "I Ain't Got Rhythm". His actions as president are very serious although sometimes he may conduct in some childish behavior. He usually enters the scene whistling "Hail to the Chief". President Martinez also appears in Hannah Montana in the episode "Take this Job and Love It". In the season 4 Hannah Montana episode "Hannah Montana to the Principal's Office," a new President visits Hannah Montana, implying that President had left office before July 18, 2010 (the date of the episode).
Victor Baxter (Rondell Sheridan) is the personal chef of the president in the White House. He is Cory and Raven Baxter's father, and husband of Tanya Baxter. He often resolves conflicts between other characters although he often conflicts with Samantha Samuels. A running gag is that he often embarrasses himself by misinterpreting what people say to him. He also often says "I'll go pack..." when Cory gets in trouble, and another of his catchphrases is "Here comes the pain...". He is the rival of Leonard Stevenson.

Recurring
Jason Stickler (Jake Thomas), nicknamed "stickman" by himself, attends Washington Prep with the characters and is the rival of Cory Baxter. He is also a classmate of Cory, Newt and Meena's, and has proved to be their enemy. Stickler has a crush on Meena and often disguises himself. He often challenges Cory, by humility, ways to win her heart, even though it is obvious that Meena has no feelings for him because he hasn't learned that he can't make her love him, it takes time for a friendship to grow. And in the end, he was always bested by Cory. His father is a C.I.A agent, that is why he has many gadgets. His father equips him with all the latest CIA technology. Jason often uses the CIA devices to his own benefit, although his plans usually go wrong. He is also sometimes seen with a 1980s-style haircut and is very proficient with the keyboard. His father is 001. He is a fan of Sci-fi movies and films. And much like Sophie, he's sometimes the antagonist and sometimes Cory, Newt, and Meena's friend since he and Cory had dinner together at the Purple Lobster after fighting over Meena on the bathroom ceiling and he helped Cory sneak the President (who was actually Burt Ponsky, the assistant manager of Cheese In A Cup) out of the mall and back into the White House and he helped Newt on his date and he needed Cory and Newt to be his friends since his robot was broken and he has been mentioned going to the movies with Cory, Newt and Meena.
Samantha Samuels (Lisa Arch) is President Richard Martinez's Personal Assistant. She is very strict and likes things fit to the President's needs. She hates Cory's schemes in which he tries to make money, which end up involving the President. Chef Victor affectionately describes Samantha as "overly stressed". She likes bird calls, and can do them better than the President. Samantha does however have a soft side which she showed to Sophie during her slumber party in "I Ain't Got No Rhythm" as it was her first one and she was ecstatic. Sophie sometimes assigns her to do her homework. It is revealed in "The Presidential Seal" that Samantha has heterochromia, when she said that she only had one grey eye.
Candy Smiles (Jordan Puryear) is a girl who attends Washington Prep and has a 4.0 Grade Point Average. She hates the lack of pep in the school in the "Smell of School Spirit". She went out with Cory a couple of times and in "We Don't Have Chemistry" they share a kiss. She is also best friends with Meena and has a black belt in karate revealed in We Have No Chemistry. She also tutored Cory in Chemistry because he was about to go to summer school. She went out with a guy named Juan Carlos making Cory jealous in "Macho Libre". She has also been to Mexico and likes Mexican things. She also knows where a certain pressure point is on the body, and whenever she is angry at Cory, she'll use it on him.
Ms. Flowers (Lori Alan) is Sophie's fourth-grade teacher. She also teaches Tanisha and Haley, who sit at the front of her classroom. Her lessons are often about random things, such as penguins and tumbleweeds. She is a good friend of President Martinez but tries not to let this affect how she teaches Sophie. She is very friendly but is a hard grader and always gives Sophie grades of B−, even when Samantha does Sophie's homework for her. Ms. Flowers tends to tell her students too much about her personal life, on one occasion mentioning that her online dates never call her back.
Tanisha (Zolee Griggs) is a bratty, spoiled 4th grader who is one of Sophie's classmates. As claimed by Sophie, she is the most popular girl in her class. She is one of the Sunshine Girls with Sophie. Tanisha cheated her way to being class president by fake crying. She appears in several different episodes. However, in some episodes it can be questioned that Tanisha and Sophie are friends, even though at first she seemed like Sophie's enemy. In "I Ain't Got No Rhythm" she nearly left Sophie's sleepover because she did not like Samantha.
Haley (Brianne Tju) is one of Sophie's best friends, and somewhat high-strung. She is terrified of school or any kind of work. Haley's mother also taught her that you should talk about people behind their backs when you don't like them (which is shown in the episode 'Making The Braid'). Haley is a Sunshine Girl, like Tanisha and Sophie. She also really likes ice cream, and was part of Sophie's singing group "The Pink Cupcakes" along with Tanisha.

Guest stars

 Raven-Symoné as Raven Baxter
 Dwayne "The Rock" Johnson as Himself
 Don Stark as Prime Minister Schozoff
 George Takei as Ronald
 Josie Loren as Jessica
 Lupe Ontiveros as Mama Martinez
 Christa B. Allen as Cheyenne
 Brittany Finamore as Jennifer Covington
 Bobb'e J. Thompson as Stanley
 Fred Stoller as Norman Trumbles
 Michael Steger as Juan Carlos
 Dan Mott as The Juicer
 Jarron Vosburg as Craig Berkowitz
 Chris Coppola as Carl
 Mary Chris Wall as Professor Bushwick
 Kate Micucci as Becky
 Lee Reherman as Slade
 Tanya Chisholm as Nicole

Production
After the completion of That's So Raven, propositions were made for a spin-off including That's So Raven Too! which was accompanied by a soundtrack of the same name, and would have been about Raven going off to college. Raven-Symoné was offered the spin-off, but she declined it, therefore Disney Channel decided to give it to Kyle Massey. Raven-Symoné would later return for the Raven's Home spin-off in 2017.

The first episode aired on Disney Channel on January 12, 2007, as a sneak peek. The show was created and produced by Dennis Rinsler and Marc Warren, who previously produced That's So Raven and Even Stevens, another Disney Channel show. Filming for Cory in the House began on July 18, 2006, and concluded on November 7, 2007, at Hollywood Center Studios (where The Suite Life of Zack & Cody and That's So Raven were filmed) and used a studio audience in most scenes.

Similar to Hannah Montana, many of the episode titles are parodies of popular songs. For example, "We Built This Kitty on Rock and Roll" comes from "We Built This City", "Mall of Confusion" from "Ball of Confusion", "Smells Like School Spirit" from "Smells Like Teen Spirit", and "Ain't Miss Bahavian" from "Ain't Misbehavin'".

Theme song and opening sequence
The theme song to Cory in the House, was written and produced by Matthew Gerrard and Robbie Nevil, and performed by Kyle Massey, Maiara Walsh, and Jason Dolley (though the closing credits of the show credit the performance of the theme song only to Massey). An alternate theme song, "Rollin' to D.C.", is also sung by Massey and Walsh and was used in the music video to promote the series.

Broadcast
The series originally aired from January 12, 2007, to September 12, 2008, on Disney Channel. The show returned to Disney Channel on September 24, 2014, as part of Disney Replay. It premiered on the same date on Family Channel and on June 1, 2011, on Disney XD (Canada). In the United Kingdom and Ireland it premiered on January 28, 2007, on Disney Channel and on September 5, 2009, on Disney XD. It premiered on February 2, 2007, on Disney Channel (Australia and New Zealand), on April 27, 2007, on Disney Channel (Southeast Asia), and on June 9, 2007, on Disney Channel (India).

Home media

Video game
The Cory in the House franchise has spawned a video game, of which it shares the same name. The game was released in 2008 for the Nintendo DS.

References

External links

 
 Cory in the House Trailers and Music Video
 

2007 American television series debuts
2008 American television series endings
2000s American teen sitcoms
2000s American black sitcoms
American television spin-offs
White House in fiction
Disney Channel original programming
English-language television shows
Television shows set in Washington, D.C.
That's So Raven
Television series about teenagers
Television series by It's a Laugh Productions
Television shows adapted into video games
Film and television memes
Internet memes introduced in 2007